Petagnaea is a monotypic genus of flowering plants in the family Apiaceae. Its only species is Petagnaea gussonei. It is named after Neapolitan botanist Vincenzo Petagna (1734-1810). It is found only in Sicily, in Mediterranean-type shrubby vegetation, and is threatened by habitat loss.

See also 
 Vincenzo Petagna
 Royal Society of Encouragement to Natural Sciences of Naples

References

Further reading 
 De Castro O., Senatore F., Rigano D., Formisano C., Cennamo P., Gianguzzi L. (2008): Composition of the essential oil of Petagnaea gussonei (Sprengel) Rauschert, a relict species from Sicily (Southern Italy). Flavour and Fragrance Journal, 23(3): 172–177. 
 De Castro O., Gianguzzi L., Colombo P., De Luca P., Marino G., Guida M. (2007): Multivariate analysis of sites using water invertebrates and land use as indicators of the quality of biotopes of Mediterranean relic plant (Petagnaea gussonei, Apiaceae). Environmental Bioindicators, 2(3): 161–171.

External links 
 

Endemic flora of Sicily
Endangered plants
Taxonomy articles created by Polbot
Apioideae
Monotypic Apioideae genera